The Flekkerøy Tunnel is a subsea road tunnel on the county road 457 in the municipality of Kristiansand in Agder county, Norway. It is the southernmost subsea tunnel in Norway. The tunnel runs under the strait between Kroodden on the mainland and the island of Flekkerøya. Construction started on the Flekkerøy tunnel on 1 August 1988. The breakthrough in the tunnel was on 6 March 1989 and the tunnel was opened on 15 August 1989. It replaced a ferry connection between Møvik in mainland Kristiansand and Lindebøkilen on the island of Flekkerøy.

Tolls were collected from the opening in 1989 until 14 July 1998. Fire safety in the tunnel is considered to be good.

Speed control 
The tunnel has a strict  speed limit. There are an automatic speed control camera in both directions in the tunnel. After complaints during the first few years after its opening of people driving too fast, the police intensified speed traps throughout the tunnel. They also filed 22 police reports and 30 driver's licenses were confiscated. That was despite the fact that the cameras are not activated at all times.

References 

Road tunnels in Agder
Subsea tunnels in Norway
1989 establishments in Norway
Tunnels completed in 1989
Kristiansand